Summerfield Street Row Historic District is a national historic district in Ridgewood, Queens, New York.  It includes 19 contributing buildings built in 1912.  They are brick two story row houses with one apartment per floor.  They feature round bays and yellow iron-spot brick facades.

It was listed on the National Register of Historic Places in 1983.

References

Houses completed in 1912
Ridgewood, Queens
1912 establishments in New York City
Historic districts on the National Register of Historic Places in Queens, New York
Historic districts in Queens, New York